Year of the Rabbit is a British television sitcom, created by Kevin Cecil and Andy Riley, that began broadcasting on Channel 4 on 10 June 2019.

Set in London in 1887, the series follows "a group of Victorian detectives including Detective Inspector Rabbit, a hardened booze-hound who’s seen it all, and his new, hapless, by-the-books partner. While investigating a local murder, the chief of police's lewd but insightful adopted daughter becomes the country's first female officer. Together, the trio must fight crime while rubbing shoulders with street gangs, crooked politicians, Bulgarian princes, spiritualists, music hall stars, and the Elephant Man."

Production

Development
On 9 October 2017, it was announced that Channel 4 had given the production a pilot order, with the episode set to be written by Andy Riley and Kevin Cecil.

On 7 June 2018, it was announced that the production had been given a series order, for a first series consisting of six episodes and that American television network IFC had joined the project as a co-producer. It was further announced that Matt Berry would serve as an additional writer and that the series would be directed by Ben Taylor. Production companies involved with the series were slated to consist of Objective Fiction with All3Media International handling distribution. On 29 January 2019, it was reported that Ben Farrell and Toby Stevens would serve as executive producers and Hannah Mackay as a producer.

Production visited the Chatham Historic Dockyard in Kent for some of the filming of the series, where exterior street scenes were filmed and the interior of the Tarred Yarn Store.

Casting
Alongside the pilot order announcement, it was confirmed that Matt Berry, Freddie Fox, and Susan Wokoma would star in the series. On 29 January 2019, it was announced that Keeley Hawes, Sally Phillips, Jill Halfpenny, David Dawson, Ann Mitchell, Alistair Petrie, Matthew Holness, and Craig Parkinson would also appear. On 6 June 2019, it was announced that Taika Waititi would be making a cameo appearance.

Cast

Main
Matt Berry as Detective Inspector Eli Rabbit; a seasoned investigator
Alun Armstrong as Chief Inspector Hugh Wisbech; Rabbit's senior officer
Freddie Fox as Detective Sergeant Wilbur Strauss; Rabbit's junior partner
Susan Wokoma as Sergeant Mabel Wisbech; Britain's first female police officer and Chief Inspector Wisbech's adopted daughter
Paul Kaye as Detective Inspector Tanner; Rabbit's arch-enemy
Ann Mitchell as Gwendoline; landlady of the Bar of Gold
Keeley Hawes as Lydia; leader of The Vision, a secret women's organisation

Recurring
David Dawson as Joseph Merrick
Alistair Petrie as George Larkham
Peter-Hugo Daly as Murky John
Amer Chadha-Patel as Detective Sergeant Keith
Sally Phillips as Princess Juliana of Bulgaria
Jill Halfpenny as Flora Wilson

Episodes

Series 1 (2019)

Broadcast and release
As well as being broadcast weekly at 10:00pm on Mondays, the entire first series was also made available as a box-set on All 4 from 10 June 2019. Outside of the United Kingdom, the series is broadcast on IFC in the United States—beginning 19 February 2020. In the autumn of 2019, the series was heavily promoted as part of the range of programming on Virgin Atlantic's onboard entertainment service Vera.

On February 11, 2020, the programme was renewed for a second series of six episodes, however Channel 4 pulled out of funding the series in January 2021 due to budgetary concerns brought by the COVID-19 pandemic, with production company Objective Media Group said to be "on the hunt for a new partner for the comedy" as a result.

References

External links

2019 American television series debuts
2019 British television series debuts
2019 American television series endings
2019 British television series endings
2010s British black comedy television series
2010s British police comedy television series
2010s British police procedural television series
2010s British sitcoms
2010s British workplace comedy television series
American detective television series
British detective television series
Channel 4 sitcoms
Cultural depictions of Joseph Merrick
English-language television shows
Fiction set in 1887
IFC (American TV channel) original programming
Murder in television
Television series by All3Media
Television series set in the 1880s
Television shows set in London